Amylaria is a genus of fungus in the family Bondarzewiaceae. The genus is monotypic, containing the single species Amylaria himalayensis, found in Bhutan.

References

External links

Russulales
Monotypic Russulales genera
Fungi of Asia